NBC 15 may refer to one of the following television stations in the United States:

Current affiliates
KADN-DT2, in Lafayette, Louisiana
KYOU-DT2, in Ottumwa, Iowa
PJA-TV, in Oranjestad, Aruba (cable channel; broadcasts on analog channel 8)
WBTS-CD, in Nashua, New Hampshire / Boston, Massachusetts (O&O)
WMTV, in Madison, Wisconsin
WPMI-TV, in Mobile, Alabama / Pensacola, Florida
WTAP-TV, in Parkersburg, West Virginia

Formerly affiliated
KLNI (now KADN-TV), in Lafayette, Louisiana (1968 to 1976)
KOGG in Wailuku, Hawaii (1995 to 2009), a former satellite of KHNL
WICD (TV), in Champaign, Illinois (1959 to 2005)
WOWL-TV (now WHDF), in Florence, Alabama (1957 to 1999)
WVEC-TV, in Hampton, Virginia (1953 to 1958)